The Buffalo mayoral election of 1985 took place on November 4, 1985 and resulted in the re-election of incumbent mayor Jimmy Griffin. Griffin lost the Democratic primary to local politician George K. Arthur but defeated Arthur in the general election after securing the Republican ballot line. This marks the last time that a candidate won the mayorship on the Republican line. It also marks the last time the Democratic nominee lost the general election until it happened again in 2021. Griffin won over his two opponents.

References

1985 New York (state) elections
Buffalo
Mayoral elections in Buffalo, New York